Aharon Amar, is a former Israeli footballer for Maccabi Haifa.

Sports career
Amar was discovered by Haifa, when word of mouth got around that a local kibbutz had a new immigrant that was an amazing footballer. After scouts saw him play, he was immediately signed and enjoyed immediate success with the Greens. 

This led to Amar being called up to the Israel national football team, where he played in the win over Yugoslavia. He played 14 times for Israel between 1958 and 1961.

He scored a league record seventeen goals in the 1958–59 Liga Leumit season. He was the last Maccabi Haifa player to top the league goalscoring until Zahi Armeli scored 25 goals in 1987–88.

References

1937 births
Living people
Moroccan Jews
Israeli footballers
Association football forwards
Maccabi Haifa F.C. players
Israel international footballers
1960 AFC Asian Cup players
Moroccan emigrants to Israel